|}

This is a list of electoral division results for the Northern Territory 2005 General Election.

Results by Electoral Division

Arafura

Araluen

Arnhem

Barkly

Blain

Braitling

Brennan

Casuarina

Daly

Drysdale

Fannie Bay

Goyder

Greatorex

Johnston

Karama

Katherine

Macdonell

Millner

Nelson

Nhulunbuy

Nightcliff

Port Darwin

Sanderson

Stuart

Wanguri

See also 

 2005 Northern Territory general election

References 

Results of Northern Territory elections